The Eparchy of Akhalkalaki, Kumurdo and Kars ( is an eparchy (diocese) of the Georgian Orthodox Church with its seat in Akhalkalaki, Georgia. It has jurisdiction over Akhalkalaki and Ninotsminda municipalities in Georgia and historical region of Kari, currently part of Turkey.

Heads

See also
Georgian Orthodox Church in Turkey

References

External links
 ახალქალაქისა და კუმურდოს ეპარქია
 ახალქალაქისა და კუმურდოს ეპარქიას ისტორიული სახელი დაუბრუნდა
 ჯაფარიძე ახალციხისა და მესხეთ-ჯავახეთის ეპარქის მმართველი
 ეპარქიის მმართველი ეპისკოპოსი სერაფიმე(ჯოჯუა)

Religious sees of the Georgian Orthodox Church
Georgian Orthodox Church in Turkey
Dioceses established in the 20th century
Eastern Orthodox dioceses in Turkey